Mugumoini is a part of Kibera slum in Nairobi. A Mugumoini Primary School exists. It is part of Langata Constituency. Many residents are Luhyas. Mugumoini has a PCEA church. Other parts of Kibera include Laini Saba, Lindi, Makina, Kianda, Gatwekera, Soweto East, Kisumu Ndogo, Makongeni, Kichinjio and Mashimoni.

See also 
Kambi Muru
Raila
Shilanga
Siranga

References 

Suburbs of Nairobi
Slums in Kenya